The Warriors of Spider is a science fiction novel by American writer W. Michael Gear. The first book in the Spider Trilogy, it was first published in 1988. The story is set roughly 600 years in the future, sometime between 2600 and 2700.

This book contains much of the same themes as the Forbidden Borders trilogy of worshiping God though experience.

Plot
The human race consists of billions of people spread throughout a relatively small area of space containing Earth and several other inhabited planets. The majority of the population lives on giant space stations, either in orbit or moving like giant ships. A change occurred over the generations that was caused by zero-gravity conditions and exposure to different radiations. Most are pale-skinned, thin and frail-boned; some would die if they experienced gravity. The human race is ruled over by the Directorate, a group of three genetically modified humans, through whom all information must pass before it is released; this has given the Directorate complete control over information for the last 600 years. They stopped all war and religion and caused humanity to be composed of mostly obedient cowards.

Before this 600-year period, the Soviets ruled humanity after conquering North America. The Native American tribes, angered that the position of reservations had not changed, fought back against the Soviets and succeeded, to the point that they were all loaded onto a giant prison ship and deported to deep space along with other rebels of Latino and Caucasian descent—a population of over 5,000 consisting entirely of people with the will and heritage to survive. The ship crashes onto a planet that they name World. 600 years later the survivors have mixed into many different clans that comprise two distinctly different and opposing peoples, the Spiders and the Santos. Their culture is mainly Native American with the addition of large bore rifles, hand-forged from metal of the wrecked prison ship and used to deal with beings they call "bears," natural predators existing on World. The World bear is similar to a dragon-squid combination, having two spines that connect at the base and a tentacle on each side with suction cups on it that it shoots toward its prey.

The Directorate accidentally picks up a bit of radio chatter from World, as the warriors use hand radios. They send out the Patrol, a combination military/police force that, under the guidance of the Directorate, has had no violence or wars to quell in over 200 years. They arrive at World expecting to find civilized people barely surviving, as with most other lost stations or colonies. On the contrary, the native warriors are savage fighters following the Native American tradition of "coup" taking, or scalping killed enemies as a method of showing how many they had killed.

They then try to conquer the Romanans, as they take to calling the descendants of the crashed star ship the natives arrived in, the Nicholai Romanan, but find that these natives aren't going down without a fight, as the Spiders, who believe Spider is the name of God and the Santos, a mix of Christian and Mexican beliefs, who call God Haysoos, are all about warfare and following what they interpret God is telling them what to do.

Publication information
Gear, Michael W. (1988).  The Warriors of Spider.  DAW Books.  .

Trilogy information
Book #1:  Gear, Michael W. (1988).  The Warriors of Spider.  DAW Books.  .
Book #2:  Gear, Michael W. (1989).  The Way of Spider.  DAW Books.  .
Book #3:  Gear, Michael W. (1989).  The Web of Spider.  DAW Books.  .

1988 American novels
1988 science fiction novels
American science fiction novels
DAW Books books
Novels set in the 27th century